Gaurav Shamsher Jang Bahadur Rana known as Gaurav Shumsher JB Rana was Chief of Army Staff of the Nepalese Army between September 2012 and August 2015. He is a descendant of Shamsher Rana family of Nepal through then Maharajkumar Baber Shamsher Jang Bahadur Rana.

Family
General Gaurav Shumsher Jung Bahadur Rana is a great, great grandson of Rana Prime Minister Chandra Shumsher Jang Bahadur Rana; the great grandson of Commanding General Babar Shumsher Jang Bahadur Rana, grandson of Lieutenant General Mrigendra Shumsher, and son of former Major General Aditya Shumsher Jang Bahadur Rana who is married to Mrs. Rohini Rana. The couple has two daughters, two grandsons and two granddaughters.

He was educated at the Asia-Pacific Center for Security Studies, Honolulu, Hawaii, United States. He was sent to The Lawrence School, Sanawar after his mother decided to send him to a place where he could stay with his maternal cousins.

References

External links

 Official biography

|-

Living people
Nepalese generals
1955 births
Members of the Order of Tri Shakti Patta, Third Class
Order of Gorkha Dakshina Bahu
Rana dynasty
20th-century Nepalese nobility
21st-century Nepalese nobility
Lawrence School, Sanawar alumni